The Prosecutor Hallers (French: Le procureur Hallers) is a 1930 French drama film directed by Robert Wiene and starring Jean-Max, Colette Darfeuil and Suzanne Delmas. It was the French-language version of the German film The Other based on the play Der Andere by Paul Lindau. The two films were made at the same studio in Berlin, with Wiene beginning work on the French version immediately after finishing the German film.

Cast
 Jean-Max as Le procureur Hallers 
 Colette Darfeuil as Marion 
 Suzanne Delmas as Emma 
 Florelle as Agnès 
 Georges Colin as Miniatur 
 Henry Krauss as Le psychiatre Köhler 
 Charles Barrois as Le commissaire 
 Bill Bocket as Fil de Fer

See also
 The Other (1913)
 The Haller Case (1933), an Italian remake

References

Bibliography
 Jung, Uli & Schatzberg, Walter. Beyond Caligari: The Films of Robert Wiene. Berghahn Books, 1999.

External links

1930 films
1930 drama films
French drama films
1930s French-language films
French films based on plays
Films directed by Robert Wiene
Films shot in Germany
Remakes of German films
Sound film remakes of silent films
French multilingual films
Tobis Film films
French black-and-white films
1930 multilingual films
1930s French films